Curculio gyongyiae is a species of weevil first discovered in 2022 in Esztergom, Hungary. Specimens have also been identified from Greece and Croatia. The average body length of females is 6.7 millimeters, and the average body length of males is 6.5 millimeters. It was originally discovered by Valentin Szénási, who named the species after his wife, Szénásiné Demeter Gyöngyi.

References 

Curculioninae
Beetles described in 2022
Beetles of Europe